Mandala is a Sanskrit word meaning "circle". It is a symbol of significance in Hinduism and Buddhism. 

Mandala may also refer to:

Geography
 The Mandala, a famous boulder problem in Bishop, California
 Blantyre, a city in Malawi, also called Mandala
 Puncak Mandala, a mountain in Papua, Indonesia

Geopolitical history
 Rajamandala, a political model in ancient South Asia
 Mandala (political model), a political model in medieval Southeast Asia
 Mandal, another word for Tehsil, an administrative division of some countries of South Asia
 Monthon, a former subdivision of Thailand

People
 Mark Mandala (died 2009), American television executive and President of the ABC
 Tommy Suharto (Hutomo Mandala Putra, born 1962), Indonesian businessman and politician

Literature
 The 10 books of the Rigveda, a Hindu religious text
 Mandala (novel) by Pearl S. Buck

Film and television
 The Devil's Sword, a 1984 Indonesian film that centers on the comic book character Mandala
 "Mandala" (Breaking Bad), the eleventh episode of the second season of Breaking Bad
 Mandala (film), a 1981 Korean film
 Mandala (TV series), a 1987 Brazilian telenovela

Music
 Synesthesia Mandala Drums, an electronic drum pad

Bands
 Mandalaband, a British progressive rock band
 Mandalas (band), a Spanish electronica group
 Mandala (band),  a Canadian R&B and soul band from the 1960s
 The Coasters Featuring the Mandala All Star Band

Albums
 Mandala (Rx Bandits album), 2009
 Mandala (Kitarō album), 1994

Other uses
 Tigerair Mandala, a low-cost airline based in Indonesia
 Mandala Stadium, a football stadium in Jayapura, Indonesia
Mandal (disambiguation)

See also
 Mandara (disambiguation)
 Mandela (disambiguation) 
 Nelson Mandela, anti-apartheid revolutionary, president of South Africa